Events in the year 2023 in Ecuador.

Incumbents 
President: Guillermo Lasso
Vice President: Alfredo Borrero

Events 

5 February — 2023 Ecuadorian constitutional referendum

References 

 
Ecuador
Ecuador
2020s in Ecuador
Years of the 21st century in Ecuador